Penn Estates is a census-designated place located in Stroud and Pocono Townships in Monroe County in the state of Pennsylvania.  The community is located northwest of the borough of East Stroudsburg.  As of the 2020 census the population was 4,493 residents.

Demographics

References

Census-designated places in Monroe County, Pennsylvania
Census-designated places in Pennsylvania